Louadjeda Benoumessad (born 1 January 1982) is a Paralympian athlete from Algeria competing mainly in category F34 javelin throw events.

She competed in the 2008 Summer Paralympics in Beijing, China. There she won a silver medal in the women's F33-34/52-53 javelin throw event. She also competed in the discus and shot put but failed to medal in either.

External links
 

Paralympic athletes of Algeria
Athletes (track and field) at the 2008 Summer Paralympics
Paralympic silver medalists for Algeria
Living people
1982 births
Medalists at the 2008 Summer Paralympics
Paralympic medalists in athletics (track and field)
21st-century Algerian women
Algerian javelin throwers
20th-century Algerian women